Bernard Renaud (known as "Renot") (born in Lyon, France, 1935) is a French-American painter, sculptor, illustrator and author.  He won the  2004 "French Merit and Devotion" Laureate - Gold Medal recipient, presented by the French Government.

References
Renot – Portrait of an Artist
Selected Awards and Exhibits

Living people
1935 births
Artists from Lyon
20th-century French painters
20th-century French male artists
French male painters
21st-century French painters
21st-century French male artists